Houma can refer to:

Houma, Louisiana, city in the United States
Houma, Shanxi, city in China
Houma people, a Native American group
Houma language, a Western Muskogean language
Houma, meaning cape, the name of some capes in Tonga and villages near them such as:
Houma (Tongatapu)
Houma ('Eua)
Houma (Vava'u)

See also 
 The Houmas, an 18th-century plantation in Louisiana, named for the Houma people
 Homa (disambiguation), which has several different meanings
 Huma (disambiguation), which has several different meanings